Alexandru Moldovan (born 23 August 1950, in Ocna Mureș) is a Romanian football manager and former midfielder.

Career

Playing career
Moldovan played for Dinamo Bucharest, Crişul Oradea, Jiul Petroșani, Progresul București, Victoria București, Metallurgistul Cugir and Unirea Alba Iulia from 1970 and 1985 until his retirement.

During his playing career Moldovan won four League titles in eight years with Dinamo Bucharest.

Coaching career
Moldovan coached a number of teams in his native Romania, including most notably Dinamo Bucharest in the 1992–93 season. His side lost 2–0 on aggregate to eventual winners Olympique de Marseille in the second round qualifiers for the group stage of the UEFA Champions League in 1993. In the same year he left Romania to coach clubs in Kuwait, Tunisia, Morocco, Algeria, Bahrain, Saudi Arabia and Egypt.

Moldovan had three successful spells as manager of Raja Casablanca. During his first era in charge, Raja won the Moroccan league title in 1997. In his second stint Raja had surprisingly sacked him in the 2001–02 season when they were seven points clear in the standings but officials felt the team were not playing attractive football and Raja ended up third after replacing him. During his third spell at the club Moldovan won the Coupe du Trône and led the Moroccan side to the semifinals of the CAF Champions League in 2005 losing 2–0 on aggregate against Tunisian side Étoile du Sahel. Moldovan was fired and replaced by Oscar Fulloné in December 2005.

Honours

Player

Club
Dinamo București
Romanian League: 1970–71, 1972–73, 1974–75, 1976–77
Romanian Cup Runner-up: 1970–71

Progresul București
Romanian Second League: 1979–80

Manager
Olympique Béja
Tunisian Super Cup: 1995
Tunisian Cup Runner-up: 1994–95

Raja Casablanca
Moroccan League: 1996–97
Moroccan Cup: 2005

Al-Salmiya
Kuwaiti Premier League: 1998

References

External links

Profile at FCDinamo.ro 
Manager record in Liga I at Labtof.ro 

1950 births
Living people
Liga I players
Liga II players
FC Dinamo București players
FC Bihor Oradea players
CSM Jiul Petroșani players
FC Progresul București players
Victoria București players
CSM Unirea Alba Iulia players
People from Ocna Mureș
Romanian footballers
Romanian football managers
Expatriate football managers in Algeria
Expatriate football managers in Morocco
Expatriate football managers in Tunisia
Expatriate football managers in Egypt
Expatriate football managers in Saudi Arabia
Expatriate football managers in Bahrain
Expatriate football managers in Kuwait
Romanian expatriate sportspeople in Tunisia
Romanian expatriate sportspeople in Kuwait
Romanian expatriate sportspeople in Morocco
Romanian expatriate sportspeople in Algeria
Romanian expatriate sportspeople in Saudi Arabia
Romanian expatriate sportspeople in Egypt
FC Dinamo București managers
Bahrain national football team managers
Club Athlétique Bizertin managers
Romanian expatriate football managers
CSM Flacăra Moreni managers
JS Kabylie managers
Raja CA managers
Wydad AC managers
FC Argeș Pitești managers
FC Bihor Oradea managers
CSM Unirea Alba Iulia managers
Association football midfielders
Qadsia SC managers
Kuwait Premier League managers
Saudi Professional League managers
Al Jahra SC managers
Al-Salmiya SC managers
Al-Ta'ee managers
Al Masry SC managers
Al Tadhamon SC managers
Olympique Béja managers
Romanian expatriate sportspeople in Bahrain
Botola managers